Macrodiplax balteata, the Marl Pennant, is a species of dragonfly in the genus Macrodiplax. It occurs in the southern United States, the Caribbean and South America.

References

Libellulidae
Odonata of North America
Odonata of South America
Insects of Central America
Insects of the Caribbean
Insects described in 1861